The Washer Woman is a sculpture by Jim Demetro, installed on a wall of Puerto Vallarta's Molino de Agua Condominium, in the Mexican state of Jalisco.

Description and history 
The statue depicts a woman washing clothes on a rock, next to a water mill. The subject of laundresses, also known as washerwomen, used to be a popular one in art. Malorie Mackey of Viva Glam Magazine said the sculpture demonstrates how Demetro "showcases the dying traditions of Puerto Vallarta".

Demetro had a smaller version of the sculpture in his possession, as of 2009.

References

External links

 
 The Washer Woman - Puerto Vallarta, Mexico at Waymarking

Outdoor sculptures in Puerto Vallarta
Sculptures of women in Mexico
Statues in Jalisco
Zona Romántica